Szymanowice may refer to the following places in Poland:
Szymanowice, Legnica County in Lower Silesian Voivodeship (south-west Poland)
Szymanowice, Środa Śląska County in Lower Silesian Voivodeship (south-west Poland)
Szymanowice, Łódź Voivodeship (central Poland)
Szymanowice, Greater Poland Voivodeship (west-central Poland)